1921 Pala, provisional designation  is a background asteroid in an unstable orbit located in the outer region of asteroid belt, approximately 8.2 kilometers in diameter. It is one of very few bodies located in the 2 : 1 mean motion resonance with Jupiter. It was discovered by Dutch–American astronomer Tom Gehrels at Palomar Observatory on 20 September 1973.

Orbit and characterization 

Pala is a non-family background asteroid from the main belt's background population. It orbits the Sun in the outer asteroid belt at a distance of 2.0–4.6 AU once every 5 years and 12 months (2,187 days; semi-major axis of 3.30 AU). Its orbit has an eccentricity of 0.39 and an inclination of 19° with respect to the ecliptic. The body's observation arc begins at Palomar with its official discovery observation.

It has a strongly unstable orbit near the 2:1 orbital resonance with Jupiter. The asteroid's orbit is expected to persist for another 18 million years though.

Pala measures approximately 8.2 kilometers in diameter, while the albedo of its surface has not been estimated. As of 2017, the body's spectral type as well as its rotation period and shape remain unknown.

Naming 

This minor planet is named after the Indian reservation, Pala, located at the base of Palomar Mountain, believed to apply to an Indian tribe whose members have lived in the area for many centuries. The official  was published by the Minor Planet Center on 20 February 1976.

See also 
 1922 Zulu
 1362 Griqua

References

External links 
 Asteroid Lightcurve Database (LCDB), query form (info )
 Dictionary of Minor Planet Names, Google books
 Asteroids and comets rotation curves, CdR – Observatoire de Genève, Raoul Behrend
 Discovery Circumstances: Numbered Minor Planets (1)-(5000) – Minor Planet Center
 
 

001921
Discoveries by Tom Gehrels
Named minor planets
19730920